William Yarnel Slack (August 1, 1816 – March 21, 1862) was a lawyer, politician, and military officer from Missouri. Born in Kentucky, Slack moved to Missouri as a child an entered the legal profession.  After serving in the Missouri state legislature from 1842 to 1843, Slack was a captain in the United States Army during the Mexican-American War.  He saw action at the Battle of Embudo Pass and the Siege of Pueblo de Taos.  Returning to his legal career, Slack became influential in his local area.

After the outbreak of the American Civil War in April 1861, Slack began to support secession.  When the Missouri State Guard was formed the next month to oppose Federal forces, Slack was appointed as a brigadier general, commanding the Guard's 4th Division.  After participating in the Battle of Carthage in July, Slack next fought in the Battle of Wilson's Creek on August 10.  After a Federal surprise attack, Slack's deployment of his division bought time for further Confederate and Missouri State Guard forces to deploy.  Suffering a bad hip wound at Wilson's Creek, Slack was unable to rejoin his command until October.  Along with a number of other Missouri State Guard soldiers, Slack transferred to the Confederate army, in which he commanded a brigade with the rank of colonel.  On March 7, 1862, during the Battle of Pea Ridge, Slack suffered another wound, close to his Wilson's Creek injury.  Infection set in, and Slack died on March 21.  He was posthumously promoted to brigadier general in the Confederate army on April 17; the Confederate States Senate may not have known that Slack was dead at the time of the promotion.

Early life and career
William Yarnel Slack was born on August 1, 1816, in Mason County, Kentucky.  Slack's father farmed and made pottery, and the family moved to Columbia in the Missouri Territory to pursue agricultural opportunities there.  After moving to Missouri, Slack's father was a justice of the peace and grew tobacco.  The younger Slack was educated in the Columbia area, studying law under one J. B. Gordon, but returned to Kentucky in 1837 to further a legal career.  After returning to Columbia in 1839, Slack was admitted to the bar and relocated to Chillicothe, where he opened a law office, as the legal market in Chillicothe was less crowded.  According to historian Jeffery S. Prushankin, Slack gained a reputation for "coolness under pressure as well as for his honesty and integrity".  Entering into politics in 1842 as a member of the Democratic Party, Slack was elected to the Missouri state legislature. His term ended in 1843. Three years later he was part of Missouri's state constitutional convention.  Slack had also married Mary E. Woodward in 1842 and fathered two children during the 1840s.

Despite opposing war, Slack organized a company in 1846 for service in the Mexican-American War.  The unit became part of the 2nd Missouri Mounted Volunteers, and Slack was voted captain of Company L.  The 2nd Missouri Volunteers served under Sterling Price during the war, and Slack was in the army for fourteen months.  Engaged in the fighting that took place in the Santa Fe area, Slack's conduct at the Battle of Embudo Pass in January 1847 gained praise from Price, and Slack's men blocked a retreat route in the Siege of Pueblo de Taos.

After his military service ended, Slack returned to Chillicothe and the legal practice.  Continuing to be involved in politics, Slack was influential in his local area.  Supporting slavery and states' rights, Slack adhered to strict constructionism and opposed secession during the 1850s. Slack's wife died in 1858; he remarried the next year and had two more children. During the 1860 United States presidential election, Slack supported the candidacy of John C. Breckinridge.  After Abraham Lincoln won the election, Slack considered secession and war likely.

Civil War service
Following Lincoln's election, a number of states in the Southern United States seceded and formed the Confederate States of America. The American Civil War began in April 1861 with the Battle of Fort Sumter, and tensions grew in Missouri, with Governor Claiborne Fox Jackson mobilizing pro-secession militia to oppose Federal forces.  A 1927 article in the Missouri Historical Review states that Slack became a leading secessionist in the area after Fort Sumter.  Federal forces commanded by Brigadier General Nathaniel Lyon dispersed Jackson's militia in the Camp Jackson affair, which ended in a bloody riot.  After the events at Camp Jackson and the riot, the state legislature formed a new militia organization known as the Missouri State Guard (MSG), which was commanded by Price.  The MSG was composed of nine divisions based on regions of the state, with each division commanded by a brigadier general.

On May 18, Slack was appointed a brigadier general in the MSG by Jackson.  Slack's command was later designed the Fourth Division, and it included Chillicothe.  From a base along the Chariton River, Slack recruited and trained soldiers for the MSG, but left the area in June, as Federal forces were moving into the area.  Slack moved his men to the Lexington area, but by that time the MSG had abandoned the state capital and had been defeated in the Battle of Boonville.  The defeat at Boonville and loss of the capital forced Price to withdraw the Guard to southern Missouri, where Price hoped to cooperate with Confederate forces in Arkansas commanded by Ben McCulloch.  James S. Rains and Slack were ordered to organize their MSG units in the Lexington area and then move south.

Jackson had gathered together MSG troops near Lamar, and in early July began moving to join Price in southern Missouri. Late on July 4, Jackson learned that Federal forces commanded by Franz Sigel were near Carthage.  Jackson formed his troopsthe divisions of Slack, Rains, John B. Clark Sr., and Mosby Monroe Parsonsin preparation to defend against an attack.  Slack's command at this time numbered about 1,200 men, and had components of both infantry and cavalry.  In the ensuing Battle of Carthage, Jackson remained in the rear and did not exercise overall command, leaving Slack and the other MSG commanders to operate largely independently. Sigel attacked the MSG lines, but was repulsed and driven back through Carthage itself.  During the fighting at Carthage, Slack's infantry was formed in the middle of the Confederate line, while his cavalry component was detached with other MSG cavalry to operate on the Federal flank. Slack's infantry was most heavily engaged during the later stages of the battle, when the retreating Federal soldiers were being pursued near the town.

The MSG then gathered at Cowskin Prairie in McDonald County, but moved to Cassville to unite with McCulloch's command.  The two forces united in late July.  By then, Lyon's Federal forces had occupied Springfield.  In early August, the combined forces of McCulloch and Price had begun an advance towards Springfield, and encamped along Wilson's Creek on August 7. Late on August 9, Slack and several other officers supported Price in pushing McCulloch to order an attack against Springfield, which was scheduled to begin the next morning. However, Lyon struck the Confederate camp in a surprise attack on the morning of August 10, bringing on the Battle of Wilson's Creek.  An acoustic shadow prevented Confederate troops from hearing the firing at the beginning of the battle, and Slack's cavalry component was surprised to encounter Lyon's troops.  Slack's cavalry, under the command of Colonel Benjamin A. Rives, made a brief stand that bought Confederate troops elsewhere time to reorganized, but was driven back. Slack quickly deployed his infantry into line next to some other Confederate cavalry to face the Federal troops. Prushankin writes that this deployment bought Price time to deploy other units into line.  This infantry was later engaged in assaulting a position that Federal troops had taken up on a prominence known as Bloody Hill, at one point holding the right of the Confederate line. Overall, the Federal lines repulsed three Confederate assaults, but withdrew from the field.

Slack had suffered a bad hip wound while leading an assault, McCulloch's post-battle report praised Slack. Because of his wound, Slack missed the campaign associated with the Siege of Lexington, but was able to resume command on October 11. In November, a portion of the Missouri state government voted to secede, creating the Confederate government of Missouri, which functioned as a government-in-exile.  Many members of the MSG formally joined the Confederate army, including Slack.  Price gave Slack a commission as a colonel in the Confederate army, although Prushankin suggests that Price may not have had authorization to do this.  After the Confederate Army of the West was formed, Slack was given command of the 2nd Missouri Brigade, a roughly 1,100-man organization that included both Confederate and MSG troops. The assigned to the 2nd Missouri Brigade occurred on January 23, 1862.

In January 1862, Price abandoned Missouri and fell back into Arkansas, having been pressured by Federal forces commanded by Brigadier General Samuel R. Curtis.  Major General Earl Van Dorn was placed in command of Confederate forces in the Trans-Mississippi, and began a campaign to retake Missouri.  Van Dorn sent his army on a hard march to reach the rear of Curtis's position, but the Federal commander was able to rotate his forces to meet the attack; bringing on the Battle of Pea Ridge on March 7.  Advancing that morning, Slack's brigade held the right of Price's forward line.  After driving back a Federal cavalry regiment, Slack's men encountered a stronger Federal line, resulting in a brief clash of skirmishers.  During the time, Slack was shot.

Confederate Colonel Thomas H. Rosser stated that the bullet hit Slack in the hip, taking a downward path to exit his body, while another of Slack's soldiers later wrote that the bullet had deflected off of a tree limb and then struck Slack in the groin. Partially paralyzed by the wound, Slack was removed from the field.  The wound was very close to where he had been injured at Wilson's Creek.  Initially transported to private home east of the field, he was moved to another location  to the east, in order to avoid capture by Federal forces.  The wound became infected after the move, and he died on March 21. The Confederate government promoted Slack to brigadier general in the Confederate army on April 17; it is possible that new of Slack's death had not reached the Confederate States Senate. Historian Ezra J. Warner writes that Slack was buried "in the yard" at the place where he died, while Prushankin states that Slack was buried in the Roller Ridge Cemetery. Slack was reburied on May 27, 1880, in the Fayetteville Confederate Cemetery. In 1887, a memorial was installed at the Pea Ridge battlefield to honor the Confederate soldiers killed at Pea Ridge.  Three Confederate generals who died in the battle were named on the memorial: Slack, McCulloch, and James M. McIntosh.

Historians William L. Shea and Earl J. Hess report that Slack was competent and popular, but had a tendence to be reckless when it came to his personal safety.  After Pea Ridge, Price wrote that Slack was one of his "best and bravest officers". According to Rosser, Slack's men "devotedly attached to him" and that he was a "model of soldierly bearing".  Prushankin writes that Confederate veterans generally viewed Slack as "a person of integrity and courage", and states that he views Slack's primary service to the Confederacy as having been his "ability to inspire and motivate his men".

See also

List of American Civil War generals (Confederate)

Notes

References

Sources

Further reading
 Bay, William Van Ness, Reminiscences of the Bench and Bar of Missouri, St. Louis: F. H. Thomas and Company, 1878.
 Sifakis, Stewart. Who Was Who in the Civil War. New York: Facts On File, 1988. .

External links

Confederate militia generals
Missouri State Guard
People of Missouri in the American Civil War
Confederate States of America military personnel killed in the American Civil War
American military personnel of the Mexican–American War
People from Mason County, Kentucky
People from Chillicothe, Missouri
Missouri lawyers
Democratic Party members of the Missouri House of Representatives
1816 births
1862 deaths
19th-century American politicians
19th-century American lawyers